The 2021–22 FKF Premier League was the 19th season of Kenyan Premier League since it began in 2003, and the 59th season of top-division football in Kenya since 1963.

Team Changes 
The following teams have changed division since the 2020–21 season.

To Premier League

Promoted from Super League 

 F.C. Talanta
 Administration Police F.C.

From Premier League

Relegated from Premier League 

 Western Stima F.C.
 Zoo Kericho F.C.

Stadiums

Personnel and sponsoring

Managerial changes

League table

Results

Season statistics

Top scorers

Hat-tricks

Notes 
4 Player scored 4 goals

References 

Kenyan Premier League seasons
2021 in Kenyan football
2022 in Kenyan football
2021–22 in African association football leagues